Dodds Township is one of sixteen townships in Jefferson County, Illinois, USA.  As of the 2010 census, its population was 2,647 and it contained 1,163 housing units.

Dodds Township bears the name of James Dodds, a pioneer settler.

Geography
The township is centered at 38°15'N 88°52'W (38.255,-89.875). It is traversed north–south by Interstate Route 57 and State Route 37, east–west by Interstate 64 and also by portions of State Routes 142 and 148.

Cities, towns, villages
 Mount Vernon (south edge)

Unincorporated towns
 Bakerville at 
 Morganville at 
 Shirley at 
(This list is based on USGS data and may include former settlements.)

Adjacent townships
 Mt. Vernon Township (north)
 Pendleton Township (east)
 Moore's Prairie Township (southeast)
 Spring Garden Township (south)
 Elk Prairie Township (southwest)
 McClellan Township (west)
 Shiloh Township (northwest)

Cemeteries
The township contains these seven cemeteries: Arnold, Bethel Memorial, Cub Prairie, Hams Grove, Meddows, Old Orchard and Warren.

Major highways
  Interstate 57
  Interstate 64
  Illinois Route 37
  Illinois Route 142
  Illinois Route 148

Airports and landing strips
 Davy Jones Airport

Demographics

Political districts
 Illinois' 19th congressional district
 State House District 107
 State Senate District 54

References
 
 United States Census Bureau 2007 TIGER/Line Shapefiles
 United States National Atlas

External links
 City-Data.com
 Illinois State Archives

Townships in Jefferson County, Illinois
Mount Vernon, Illinois micropolitan area
Townships in Illinois